Deuces Wild is a studio album by Frankie Laine released in 1962 on Columbia Records.

Track listing

References 

1962 albums
Frankie Laine albums
Columbia Records albums